Eupithecia lecerfiata is a moth in the  family Geometridae. It is found on Nevis.

References

Moths described in 1984
lecerfiata
Moths of the Caribbean